The Earth Rights Institute was founded by Alanna Hartzok and Annie Goeke in 2002 and is a registered non-profit with offices in Pennsylvania and California and major partners in Senegal and Ivory Coast. Earth Rights Institute has a strong focus on ecological village development, land rights, and land value capture/taxation policy. Earth Rights Institute is a member organization of the International Union for Land Value Taxation, a United Nations NGO based in London and recently, a partner organization for the EcoEarth Alliance, an NGO stakeholder of the UN Commission on Sustainable Development.

Incorporated in 2001 and recognized as a 501(c)(3) non-profit organization by the US Internal Revenue Service, Earth Rights Institute (ERI) takes an innovative approach to join education, advocacy and research in building ecologically, economically and culturally sustainable communities in some of the world’s poorest regions. Earth Rights Institute advocates a model of development that supports the re-localization of development expertise. ERI believes that, in order to empower communities of the global south to manage and direct their own development, strategies and expert knowledge must be conceived locally. ERI is a United Nations NGO affiliate for ECOSOC, UN Habitat, UNCSD, and UN Finance and Development, and has the following objectives:

Empower impoverished communities of the global south in managing and directing their own local development.
Bridge the divide between academic research in sustainable development and action in the field.
Build a culture of Peace by promoting cross-cultural collaboration and encouraging appreciation for cultural diversity.
Advance solutions to crucial global issues in African development and create awareness by supporting African Solidarity across the globe.

External links 
The Earth Rights Institute website
Liberia Diabetes Center gets partnership in United States

Environmental justice organizations
Environmental organizations based in the United States
Georgist organizations